Joseph Yerimid Rosales Erazo (born 6 November 2000) is a Honduran professional footballer who plays as a midfielder for Major League Soccer club Minnesota United and the Honduras national team.

Rosales joined Minnesota United on loan in August, 2021 after three seasons with C.A. Independiente de La Chorrera of Liga Panemeña de Fútbol. After making 24 appearances in the 2022 MLS season, Minnesota Unites signed Rosales to a one-year contract with club options for 2024 and 2025.  

In March, 2022, Rosales was called up to play for the Honduras National Football Team.

Career statistics

Club

References

Living people
2000 births
Sportspeople from Tegucigalpa
Honduran footballers
Honduras youth international footballers
Association football midfielders
Liga Dominicana de Fútbol players
C.A. Independiente de La Chorrera players
Minnesota United FC players
Honduran expatriate footballers
Expatriate footballers in Panama
Honduran expatriate sportspeople in the United States
Expatriate soccer players in the United States
Major League Soccer players
Honduras international footballers
Honduras under-20 international footballers